Troubadour is the second studio album by American band The Stepkids from Connecticut. It was released on September 10, 2013, through Stones Throw Records. The production was handled by Dan Edinberg, Jeff Gitelman and Tim Walsh.

There were four music videos released from the album: "Sweet Salvation" directed by Jesse Mann, "The Lottery" directed by Nicki Chavoya and Lisa Amadeo, "The Art of Forgetting" directed by Georgia, and "Moving Pictures" directed by Henry Demaio.

Track listing

Personnel
Dan Edinberg – vocals, bass, double bass (upright bass), synthesizer, keyboards, recording, mixing, producer
Jeff Gitelman – vocals, guitar, guitar synthesizer, keyboards, recording, mixing, producer
Tim Walsh – vocals, drums, percussion, timpani, recording, mixing, producer
Michael Faust – voice (track 1)
Christyn Martino – voice (track 2)
Jessica Erzen – voice (track 2)
Erik Elligers – tenor saxophone (track 2)
John Panos – trumpet (track 2)
David Pond – turntables (track 2)
Matthew Martin – keyboards (track 3)
Jon Blanck – flute (track 7)
Ben Dean – violin (track 7)
Fred DiLeone – clavinet (track 8)
Joel Edinberg – alto and baritone saxophone (track 8)
Matt Oestreicher – organ (track 9)
Dave Cooley – mastering
Jeff Jank – art direction
Thomas Brendan – artwork, design

References

External links
 The Stepkids – Troubadour at Bandcamp
 

2013 albums
The Stepkids albums
Stones Throw Records albums